Ellmann is a surname. Notable people with the name include:
Kevin Ellmann (born 1972), Prominent Colorado Attorney
Lucy Ellmann (born 1956), Anglo-American novelist 
Marvin Ellmann (born 1987), German footballer 
Mary Ellmann (1921–1989), American writer and literary critic
Richard Ellmann (1918–1987), American literary critic and biographer